Emil Rockov (born 27 January 1995) is a Serbian professional footballer who plays as a goalkeeper for Hungarian club Fehérvár. He represented Serbia under-17 level and made his senior national debut in 2019.

Club career

Vojvodina
Rockov started playing football at "Bolesnikov" football academy at the age of 9, where he has started growing up as a goalkeeper. Later, at the age of 11, he joined Vojvodina where he passed youth categories and joined the first team as a back-up choice during the 2013–14 Serbian SuperLiga season. In 2014, Rockov also signed his first professional contract. For the next season, after he overgrown youth team, he was loaned to Serbian League Vojvodina side Sloga Temerin, where he played mostly matches as a bonus player. In summer 2015, Rockov moved to Proleter Novi Sad. After he spent the first half-season as a loaned player under contract with Vojvodina, having split playing time with Nemanja Buzadžija, and playing 8 matches in total, Rockov joined Proleter as a single-player in the winter break off-season.

After he spent the whole year under contract with Proleter, Rockov returned to Vojvodina at the beginning of 2017 and signed a three-year contract with club. He made his debut for the first team of Vojvodina in the 22nd fixture match of the 2016–17 Serbian SuperLiga season, against Spartak Subotica, played on 19 February 2017, under coach Dragan Ivanović. During the game, Rockov neutralized several big chances for the opponent team, and he was also nominated for the man of the match on his first official appearance for the team. Rockov collected over 720 minutes without a conceded goal in the Serbian SuperLiga matches between May and August 2017, including 2016–17 and 2017–18 seasons. After four clean sheets he kept at the beginning of the season, Rockov had been beaten by Bojan Ostojić in 89 minute of the match against Partizan on 13 August 2017, for the first Vojvodina's lost game in the 2017–18 Serbian SuperLiga season. Despite the one ball in his goal, Rockov was elected for the man of the match. In the meantime, Rockov also made an assist to Joseph Bempah in 2–0 away victory over Borac Čačak on 9 August 2017. On 29 December 2017, Rockov signed a one-year-extension to his contract with the club. In May 2018, Rockov was elected for the best player of FK Vojvodina in the past season, by fans choice. On 18 September 2018, Rockov signed another one-year-extension to his contract with the club, until June 2022. In May 2019, Rockov, then a club captain, was elected for the best player of FK Vojvodina in the past season for the second consecutive time.

On July the 17th 2020, Rockov joined Hungarian side MOL Fehérvár FC.

On 20 January 2022, Rockov returned to Vojvodina on loan from MOL Fehérvár until the end of the season.

International
He made his Serbia national football team debut on 10 October 2019 in a friendly against Paraguay. He substituted Predrag Rajković in the 89th minute.

Personal life
Born in Novi Sad, Rockov grown up in the local neighborhood Telep. In his early years, Rockov trained Karate. Emil's parents are scientists. They are physicists by the profession, and his older sister graduated English language. Rockov has also studied psychology at the University of Belgrade Faculty of Philosophy.

Career statistics

Club

Honours
Vojvodina
Serbian Cup: 2013–142019–20

References

External links
 
 
 
 

1995 births
Living people
Footballers from Novi Sad
Serbian footballers
Serbia youth international footballers
Serbia international footballers
Association football goalkeepers
FK Sloga Temerin players
FK Proleter Novi Sad players
FK Vojvodina players
Fehérvár FC players
Serbian First League players
Serbian SuperLiga players
Nemzeti Bajnokság I players
Serbian expatriate footballers
Expatriate footballers in Hungary
Serbian expatriate sportspeople in Hungary